This is a list of seasons played by Hapoel Jerusalem Football Club in Israeli and European football, from 1928 (when the club joined the newly founded EIFA) to the most recent completed season. It details the club's achievements in major competitions, and the top scorers for each season. Top scorers in bold were also the top scorers in the Israeli league that season. Records of minor competitions such as the Lilian Cup are not included due to them being considered of less importance than the State Cup and the Toto Cup.

The club has won the State Cup once. Its best ever position in the top division was achieved in 1972–73, when the club finished third. The club has never been out of the three top divisions of Israeli football.

History
Hapoel Jerusalem Football Club was established in 1926. In 1928 the club joined the EIFA and competed in its competitions ever since. The club played in Palestine League during the league's first four seasons, however, as travelling was limited, the club competed mainly in Jerusalem during the British Mandate, rejoining the national league after the establishment of Israel. The club was promoted to the top division in 1957, where he stayed until the end of the 1978–79 season, bouncing between the two top division for the next two decades. In 2001 the club dropped to the third division for the first time in its history, bouncing back up the following season. Aside from two seasons played in the third tier, the club played in Liga Leumit since. 

The club had appeared in the State Cup final four times, the first in 1943, winning once, in 1973.

Seasons

Key

 P = Played
 W = Games won
 D = Games drawn
 L = Games lost
 F = Goals for
 A = Goals against
 Pts = Points
 Pos = Final position

 Premier = Ligat HaAl (Premier League) (1st tier since 2000)
 Leumit = Liga Leumit (1st tier 1955 to 2000; 2nd tier since 2000)
 Artzit = Liga Artzit  (2nd tier 1977 to 2000; 3rd tier 2000 to 2009)
 Alef = Liga Alef (1st tier 1947 to 1955; 2nd tier 1955 to 1977; 3rd tier 1977 to 2000 and since 2009)
 Pal. League = Palestine League

 R1 = Round 1
 R2 = Round 2
 R3 = Round 3
 R4 = Round 4
 R5 = Round 5
 R6 = Round 6
 R7 = Round 7
 R8 = Round 8
 R9 = Round 9
 QF = Quarter-finals
 SF = Semi-finals
 Group = Group stage

Notes

References

Hapoel Jerusalem F.C.
 
Hapoel Jerusalem